The 2016–17 season is the 85th season in Málaga CF's history and it's 36th in La Liga.

Squad

Competitions

Overall

Overview

La liga

League table

Results summary

Matches

See also
 Atlético Malagueño
 CD Málaga
 Trofeo Costa del Sol
 Football in Spain

References

External links
  
 Málaga CF at La Liga 
 Málaga CF at UEFA 

Málaga CF seasons
Malaga CF